United Nations Security Council Resolution 41, adopted on February 28, 1948, commended both parties in the Indonesian National Revolution for the recent signing of a truce and attempts to comply with United Nations Security Council Resolution 27.  Repeated the offer of mediation made in United Nations Security Council Resolution 31 and requested the Committee of Good Offices keep them informed as to the progress of political settlement in the Indonesia.

The resolution passed with seven votes; Colombia, Syria, the Ukrainian Soviet Socialist Republic and the Soviet Union abstained.

See also
 United Nations Security Council Resolution 40
 List of United Nations Security Council Resolutions 1 to 100 (1946–1953)

References
Text of the Resolution at undocs.org

External links
 

 0041
Indonesian National Revolution
 0041
 0041
1948 in Indonesia
February 1948 events